Robert Peake may refer to:
Robert Peake the elder (c. 1551–1619), English painter
Sir Robert Peake (c. 1592–1667), print-seller and royalist
Robert Peake (British Army officer) (born 1903), British brigadier